Laura Jones (born October 15, 1969) is an American former soccer player who played as a defender, making one appearance for the United States women's national team.

Career
Jones played basketball and volleyball for the Esperanza Aztecs in high school, while playing club soccer for the Nightmares youth team in Los Angeles. In college, she played for the Colorado College Tigers from 1987 to 1990, having been offered an athletic scholarship by Colorado College. In total, she scored seventeen goals and recorded six assists for the Tigers. She was a Second-Team All-American in 1988 and 1989, and was included in the Senior Recognition Team selection in 1990.

Jones was selected to compete at the U.S. Olympic Festival in 1986 and 1989. She made her only international appearance for the United States on August 16, 1992 in a friendly match against Norway, which finished as a 2–4 loss.

Her career was ended after blowing out her knee. Jones has coached girls' and boys' club youth soccer teams.

Personal life
Jones is from Yorba Linda, California, and graduated with a Bachelor of Arts in English from Colorado College. She works as an elementary school teacher, having received her credentials at California State University, Fullerton, and her master's degree in education from Grand Canyon University. She currently teaches at Rolling Hills Elementary School in Fullerton, California.

Career statistics

International

References

1969 births
Living people
People from Yorba Linda, California
Sportspeople from Orange County, California
Soccer players from California
American women's soccer players
United States women's international soccer players
Women's association football fullbacks
Colorado College Tigers women's soccer players
Schoolteachers from California
American women educators
California State University, Fullerton alumni
Grand Canyon University alumni